Nanshi Cuisine Street is located in Nanshi, the busiest section of the city's downtown area of Tianjin, China. It is a national, classic and palatial architectural complex. Nanshi Cuisine Street looks like an ancient walled city enclosed by a circle of neat three-story buildings. There is a crossroad in the "city," and at the centre of the crossroad is a musical fountain. The entire structure is covered with a glass roof. Even not tasting anything, one could be attracted by the buildings itself, which carry a kind of classical ethnic beauty. The green glazed roof tile, colored vivid pattern compel the admiration.

Nanshi Cuisine Street houses over 100 shops trading in delicacies from across China, is also a marvelous gastronomic wander. For those who are hungry to dip their chopsticks into Chinese dishes of various flavors, the food street provides some of the country's best choices. It is particularly known for its seafood, culled from the port area of Tanggu. In typical Chinese custom, the fish is brought live to your table for your pre-cooking approval before being prepared.

Snacks

Goubuli Steamed Stuffed Bun

Tianjin is famous for the cheap eats and the great snacks. The most outstanding contribution to the Chinese menu are Goubuli Steamed Stuffed Bun. "Goubuli" literally translated as "dog does not care". There are several stories about the origin of the delicious meat buns.

Crispy deep-fried dough twists

Crispy deep-fried dough twists is made from wheat mixed with sesame seed, sugar, preserved fruits and nuts.

Jianbing Guozi
Jianbing guozi is a thin pancake made from green bean flour. When it is being grilled, an egg is broken and spread over the top of the pancake, then a sweet soy sauce and a hot sauce is spread over the pancake. The pancake is then wrapped around a Chinese donut.

The Chinese crafts

There are also Yangliuqing New Year Pictures (nianhua), Zhang's Clay Sculptures, Wei's Kites and other typical folk arts been sold on the street.

The clay sculptures are famous in Tianjin, especially those made by Zhang family. Unlike the colorful clay sculptures from other parts of China, the works by the Zhangs are a reflection on life; the eyes of these small mud men sculptures express sorrow, happiness, joy and frustration. The Zhang's and other shops selling these sculptures can be found on the street.

The New Year Pictures (nianhua) of Yangliuqing combine delineation, woodcarving, overprinting, color painting and mounting techniques; and feature an exquisite touch, smooth lines, elaborate techniques, lifelike color paintings and a vivid luster, especially the color paintings of human faces, which are fine, bright and true to life.

Buildings and structures in Tianjin
Shopping districts and streets in China
Tourist attractions in Tianjin